Zebulon Doyle "Zeb" Alley (August 9, 1928 – July 11, 2013) was an American lawyer, lobbyist, and politician.

Born in Sylva, North Carolina, he graduated from high school at Oak Ridge Military Academy. Alley served in the United States Army during the Korean War and received the Bronze Star. He then received his bachelors and law degrees from the University of North Carolina at Chapel Hill and then practiced law and was a lobbyist. He served in the North Carolina State Senate 1971-1973 as a Democrat. Alley also was city attorney for Waynesville, North Carolina, general counsel to Governor Jim Hunt, and served on the North Carolina Board of Alcoholic Beverages.

He died in Raleigh, North Carolina.

Notes

1928 births
2013 deaths
People from Waynesville, North Carolina
People from Sylva, North Carolina
University of North Carolina at Chapel Hill alumni
University of North Carolina School of Law alumni
North Carolina lawyers
Democratic Party North Carolina state senators
20th-century American politicians
20th-century American lawyers